The Toshkan is a river in the Tien Shan mountains in the border area between China and Kyrgyzstan. The Toshkan has its sources in the At-Bashi range and Kakshaal Too south of the Kyrgyzstani city of Naryn. In its uppermost course, upstream of the confluences with the rivers Müdürum and Kökkyya, it is called Aksay; from these confluences to the border with China, it is called Kakshaal. It then flows towards the east and into the Xinjiang province of China. It continues east, running parallel to the Tien Shan mountains, until its confluence with the Aksu River near the city Aksu. The Toshkan is the largest tributary of the Aksu.

References

Rivers of Xinjiang
Rivers of Kyrgyzstan
International rivers of Asia